Podomachla is a genus of tiger moths in the family Erebidae.

Species
Podomachla acraeina
Podomachla antinorii
Podomachla apicalis
Podomachla arieticornis
Podomachla chromis
Podomachla insularis
Podomachla usambarae
Podomachla virgo

References
Natural History Museum Lepidoptera generic names catalog

Nyctemerina
Moth genera